Kizuna centrosomal protein is a protein that in humans is encoded by the KIZ gene.

Function

The protein encoded by this gene localizes to centrosomes, strengthening and stabilizing the pericentriolar region prior to spindle formation. The encoded protein usually remains with the mother centrosome after centrosomal duplication. Several transcript variants encoding different isoforms have been found for this gene. [provided by RefSeq, Feb 2013].

Clinical significance 

Mutations in KIZ cause Rod-cone dystrophy (RCD).

References

Further reading